The International Concatenated Order of Hoo-Hoo, Incorporated is a fraternal and service organization whose members are involved in the forests products industry. Hoo-Hoo has members in the United States, Canada, Australia, New Zealand, Malaysia and South Africa.

History 

The organization was founded on January 21, 1892 at Gurdon, Arkansas by six men: B. Arthur Johnson, editor of the Timberman of Chicago; William Eddy Barns, editor of the St. Louis Lumberman; George Washington Schwartz of Vandalia Railroad, St. Louis; A. Strauss of Malvern Lumber Company, Malvern, Arkansas; George Kimball Smith of the Southern Lumber Manufacturers Association; and William Starr Mitchell, business manager of the Arkansas Democrat of Little Rock, Arkansas.

As most of these men were only connected to the lumber industry in a tangential way — company executives, newspapermen, railroad men, etc. — it was first suggested that the name of the new organization be "Independent Order of Camp Followers". However the group instead settled on the name Concatenated Order of Hoo-Hoo — the term hoo hoo having become synonymous with the term lumberman.

The first regular Concatenation was held at the St. Charles Hotel in New Orleans, Louisiana, on February 18, 1892, when 35 of the leading lumbermen of the country were initiated.

Membership 
Membership was restricted to white males over 21 who were engaged in the lumber industry as lumbermen, newspapermen, railroad men and saw mill machinery men. A Mrs. M. A. Smith of Smithton, Arkansas was initiated before the gender requirement was passed, so she stayed on as the Order's only female member. The Order was limited to having a maximum of 9,000 members. In the late 1890s, it had upwards of 5,000 members. By the early 1920s, this had grown to approximately 7,000.

Membership is currently limited to people 18 and up who are of good moral character and are engaged in the forestry industry or "genuinely interested in supporting the purpose and aims of our order."

Organization 
The order was more informal than other secret societies of its day. It did not have lodge rooms, enforced attendance at meetings or anything else that other orders had that could be avoided. The executive committee of the Order was known as the Supreme Nine and consisted of the Snark, the Senior Hoo-Hoo, Junior Hoo-Hoo, Scrivenoter, Bojum, Jabberwock, Custocatian, Arcanoper and Gurdon. Judicial affairs and care of the emblem were delegated to a House of the Ancients which consisted of the past executives of the Order and whose members served for life. By the late 1890s, the House included B. Arthur Johnson, William Eddy Barns and James E. Defebaugh. Each state or foreign country was ruled by a Viceregent Snark. Local groups were called Concatenations.

In 1923, the Order's headquarters was at the Arcade Building in St. Louis.

The Order did not have any sick, disability or death benefits, but it did quietly perform some charitable work among its members and assist them in finding employment.

Ritual and symbolism 
The founders wanted the organization to be unconventional and unregimented. Its one aim would be "to foster the health, happiness, and long life of its members". In a spirit of fun, names for some of the officers were inspired by Lewis Carroll's The Hunting of the Snark. The Hoo-Hoo emblem is a black cat with its tail curled into the shape of a figure nine.

Atlanta branch

The Atlanta chapter of the Hoo Hoos worked and socialized with the Southern Forestry Congress. A monument commemorating the planting of trees by the Atlanta chapter of the Hoo Hoo Club in 1926 stands just inside the Park Avenue entrance to Piedmont Park.

See also 
 Alexandria Hoo Hoos
 Hoo Hoo Monument
 New Zealand Timber Museum
 Orange Hoo–Hoos

References

External links
 Hoo-Hoo International website
 The bulletin. A monthly journal devoted to the interests of Hoo-Hoo
 Concatenated Order of Hoo-Hoo at The Encyclopedia of Arkansas History and Culture
 Inventory of the International Concatenated Order of Hoo-Hoo, Inc., Records, 1892–1972 in the Forest History Society Library and Archives, Durham, North Carolina
 January 21, 1892: Hoo-Hoo International, Not Your Father’s Skull and Bones

1892 establishments in Arkansas
Fraternal orders
History of Arkansas
Men's organizations in the United States
Organizations established in 1892
Secret societies in the United States
Organizations based in Arkansas